Fernando Álvaro Lamas y de Santos (January 9, 1915 – October 8, 1982) was an Argentine-American actor and director, and the father of actor Lorenzo Lamas.

Biography

Argentina
Fernando Álvaro Lamas y de Santos was born in Buenos Aires, Argentina. His movies included En el último piso (1942), Frontera Sur (1943), Villa rica del Espíritu Santo (1945), and Stella (1946).

Lamas was also seen in The Poor People's Christmas (1947), The Tango Returns to Paris (1948), and The Story of a Bad Woman (1948). He had the lead in La rubia Mireya (1949) alongside Mecha Ortiz, and a key role in De padre desconocido (1949), Vidalita (1949) and The Story of the Tango (1950). He also appeared in Corrientes, calle de ensueños (1949), and La otra y yo (1950). He was reportedly the third biggest star in the country. His first American film was The Avengers (1950) for Republic Pictures shot on location in Argentina. Some scenes were filmed in the US, leading to Lamas going to Hollywood.

MGM

In September 1949, he signed a contract with Metro-Goldwyn-Mayer and went on to play mainly "Latin Lover" roles and occasionally sing in musicals.
In 1951, Lamas starred as Paul Sarnac in the musical, Rich, Young and Pretty with Jane Powell. He supported Greer Garson and Michael Wilding in The Law and the Lady (1952) which was a flop.

MGM gave him a star tenor part as Lana Turner's love interest in the popular operetta The Merry Widow (1952) by Franz Lehár. He romanced Elizabeth Taylor in The Girl Who Had Everything (1952), which was also successful. Lamas went to Paramount Pictures where he was top billed in Sangaree (1953). Back at MGM he was Esther Williams' leading man in Dangerous When Wet (1953), a big success. At Warner Bros. Lamas starred in The Diamond Queen (1954). He did Lost Treasure of the Amazon (1954) at Paramount then returned to MGM for a remake of Rose Marie (1954) supporting Howard Keel and Ann Blyth. It was popular but failed to recoup its cost. At Paramount he was Rosalind Russell's leading man in The Girl Rush (1955). Lamas started appearing on television, including an adaptation of Hold Back the Dawn for Lux Video Theatre. 

"I couldn't break the Latin lover image", Lamas later claimed. He co-starred on Broadway in the 1956 musical Happy Hunting with Ethel Merman, for which he was nominated for a Tony Award.

Television
Lamas did episodes of Jane Wyman Presents The Fireside Theatre ("The Bravado Touch"), Climax! ("Spider Web"), Pursuit ("Eagle in a Cage"), Shirley Temple's Storybook, Zane Grey Theatre but returned to features with The Lost World (1960). He also guest starred in one episode of The Lucy Desi Comedy Hour
Lamas also appeared in the TV show "Combat!" (season 5 episode 4) "Brothers."

Europe
Lamas moved to Europe with Esther Williams who became his wife. He directed a film both starred in, Magic Fountain, shot in 1961 and never released in the US. He went to Italy for Duel of Fire (1962), and Revenge of the Musketeers (1963). He helped write the Western A Place Called Glory (1965).

Return to the U.S.
Lamas returned to Hollywood. As an actor he focused on television, with guest appearances on Burke's Law, The Virginian, Laredo, Combat!, The Red Skelton Hour, Hondo and The Girl from U.N.C.L.E.. From 1965 to 1968 Lamas had a regular role as Ramon De Vega on Run For Your Life, which starred Ben Gazzara; Lamas also directed some episodes.

He had a support role in Valley of Mystery (1967), a pilot for a series that did not proceed. He directed another feature film, The Violent Ones, which was released in 1967 and co-starred Aldo Ray and David Carradine. He was in Kill a Dragon (1967) and 100 Rifles (1969) and had guest roles on The High Chaparral, The Macahans, Tarzan, Then Came Bronson, It Takes a Thief, Mission: Impossible, The Name of the Game, Dan August, Alias Smith and Jones, Bearcats!, Mod Squad, Night Gallery, and McCloud.

TV director
Lamas started directing TV as well: The Bold Ones: The Lawyers, Mannix, Alias Smith and Jones, S.W.A.T., The Rookies, Jigsaw John, Starsky and Hutch, The Hardy Boys/Nancy Drew Mysteries, The Amazing Spider-Man, Secrets of Midland Heights, Flamingo Road, and Code Red. As an actor, he was in the TV movies The Lonely Profession (1969) and Murder on Flight 502 (1975). He could also be seen in Bronk, Switch (which he also directed), Won Ton Ton: The Dog Who Saved Hollywood (1976), Quincy M.E., Charlie's Angels, Police Woman, The Love Boat, The Cheap Detective, How the West Was Won, The Dream Merchants and House Calls.

Last years and death 
Lamas produced the TV movie Samurai, released in 1979. He directed episodes of Falcon Crest co-starring his son, Lorenzo. He also helmed Bret Maverick and several episodes of House Calls.

He had a supporting role in the series Gavilan when he fell ill with cancer. His scenes were shot with Patrick Macnee.

Fernando Lamas died of pancreatic cancer in Los Angeles, aged 67. His ashes were scattered by close friend Jonathan Goldsmith from his sailboat.

Personal life
Lamas was married four times. His first marriage was to Argentine actress Perla Mux in 1940 and they had a daughter, Christina, before divorcing in 1944. His second marriage was in 1946 to Lydia Babacci (or Barachi); this marriage also produced a daughter, Alexandra. They were divorced in 1952. His third wife was the American actress Arlene Dahl. They were married in 1954. They were later divorced in 1960. Out of this marriage was born a son, Lorenzo Lamas (born January 20, 1958). His longest marriage was to swimmer and actress Esther Williams in 1969, and they remained married until Lamas's death in 1982.

In popular culture
His friend, actor Jonathan Goldsmith, took inspiration from Lamas for the character The Most Interesting Man in the World.
The most well known parody of Fernando was on the Saturday Night Live sketches that featured Billy Crystal.
In the recurring Fernando's Hideaway sketch, Crystal used Lamas's accent for inspiration, as well as a quote from the actor: "It is better to look good than to feel good."

Filmography

Film
 1943 On the Last Floor
 1943 Stella
 1943 Southern Border
 1945 Villa rica del Espíritu Santo
 1947 The Poor People's Christmas
 1947 Evasion as Bruno
 1948 The Tango Returns to Paris
 1948 Story of a Bad Woman
 1948 La Rubia Mireya as Alberto
 1949 The Unknown Father
 1949 Vidalita
 1949 The Story of the Tango as Juan Carlos Maldonado
 1949 Corrientes, calle de ensueños
 1949 La Otra y yo
 1950 The Avengers as André LeBlanc
 1951 Rich, Young and Pretty as Paul Sarnac
 1951 The Law and the Lady as Juan Dinas
 1952 The Merry Widow as Count Danilo
 1953 The Girl Who Had Everything as Victor Y. Raimondi
 1953 Sangaree as Dr. Carlos Morales
 1953 Dangerous When Wet as Andre LaNet
 1953 The Diamond Queen as Jean Baptiste Tavernier
 1954 Jivaro as Rio Galdez
 1954 Rose Marie as James Severn Duval
 1955 The Girl Rush as Victor Monte
 1960 The Lost World as Manuel Gomez
 1962 Duel of Fire as Antonio Franco
 1963 Revenge of the Musketeers as D'Artagnan
 1963 Magic Fountain as Alberto
 1965 A Place Called Glory
 1967 The Violent Ones as Manuel Vega
 1967 Kill a Dragon as Nico Patrai
 1969 100 Rifles as General Verdugo
 1976 Won Ton Ton, the Dog Who Saved Hollywood as Premiere Male Star
 1978 The Cheap Detective as Paul DuChard

Television
 1954 Lux Video Theatre
 1958 The Lucy–Desi Comedy Hour ("Lucy Goes to Sun Valley")
 1958 Jane Wyman Presents as Juan Bravado
 1958 Climax! as Jose Aragon
 1960 Dick Powell's Zane Grey Theatre as Giulio Mandati / Miguel
 1969 Shirley Temple's Storybook as Professor Fritz Bhaer
 1965 Burke's Law as Kelly Mars / El Greco
 1965 The Virginian as Captain Estrada
 1965 Combat! ("Breakout") as Vertrain
 1966 Laredo as Paco Romero
 1966 Combat! ("The Brothers") as Leon Paulon 
 1966 The Girl from U.N.C.L.E. as Salim Ibn Hydari / Alejandro De Sada
 1967 Valley of Mystery as Francisco Rivera
 1965-1968 Run for Your Life as Ramon De Vega
 1971 The Red Skelton Show ("A Spy Is a Peeping Tom on Salary") as Harry Sneak 
 1967 Hondo ("Hondo and the Comancheros") as Rodrigo
 1967 The High Chaparral ("The Firing Wall") as "El Caudillo"
 1968 Tarzan ("Jungle Ransom") as Velasquez
 1968-1970 It Takes a Thief as Paolo Monteggo / Pepe Rouchet / Francisco Arascan
 1968-1970 Misson Impossible as Ramon Prado / Roger Toland
 1969 Then Came Bronson ("Where Will the Trumpets Be?") as Miguel Cordova
 1969 The Lonely Profession as Dominic Savarona
 1970 The Name of the Game as Cesar Rodriguez
 1971 Dan August as Tony Storm
 1971 Alias Smith and Jones as Jim "Big Jim" Santana
 1971 Bearcats! as Chucho Morales (Pilot Movie, "Powderkeg")
 1971-1973 The Mod Squad as Arturo Roca / Lieutenant Ramon Sanchez
 1973 Night Gallery as Dr. Ramirez (segment "Hatred Unto Death")
 1974 Sesame Street as himself (guest appearance)
 1975 McCloud as Max Cortez
 1975 Murder on Flight 502 as Paul Barons
 1975 Bronk as Abriega
 1976 Switch as Fouad
 1977 Charlie's Angels as Jericho
 1977 Police Woman as Carlos Rubenez
 1978 The Love Boat as Bill Klieg / Bill Teague
 1979 How the West Was Won as Fierro
 1980 House Calls ("Defeat of Clay") as Dr. Langston
 1980 The Dream Merchants as Conrad Stillman (final appearance)

Radio appearances

References

External links

 
 Fernando Lamas at Virtual History

1915 births
1982 deaths
American male film actors
American male television actors
American television directors
Argentine emigrants to the United States
Hispanic and Latino American male actors
Burials at Angelus-Rosedale Cemetery
Deaths from cancer in California
Deaths from pancreatic cancer
Metro-Goldwyn-Mayer contract players
People from Buenos Aires
20th-century American male actors